Kalayaan College (or KC) is a private, non-sectarian higher education institution formerly located in Marikina that has since moved to Quezon City. It was established in 2000.

Kalayaan College is on Manga Road cor Aurora Blvd, near the Line 2 Betty Go-Belmonte. It was established by big names in academic institutions. The college's president, Dr. José Abueva, is a former president of the University of the Philippines.

The college follows UP's curriculum, such as the grading system for students (where 1.00 is the highest and 5.00 is the lowest or failing grade). Most of the professors are members of UP's faculty or UP graduates. 

On July 4, 2022, Kalayaan College announced that it will end its operations after 22 years due to financial losses.

Bachelor courses

Bachelor in Science courses
Kalayaan College's Bachelor in Science courses include Business Administration, Hospitality Management, Computer Science,  and Psychology.

Bachelor in the Arts courses
KC's Bachelor in the Arts courses include Psychology, Journalism, and Literature.

Other Bachelor courses
Kalayaan College has bachelor courses in Public Administration, Early Childhood Care and Development, Fine Arts (Major in Studio Arts /Visual Communication).

Other courses
Kalayaan College offers Associate in Arts and Sciences, Associate in Computer Technology, and Certificate in Fine Arts.

References

External links
Kalayaan College official website

Educational institutions established in 2000
Liberal arts colleges in the Philippines
Universities and colleges in Quezon City
2000 establishments in the Philippines